Kiki Shepard (born Chiquita Renee Shepard; July 15, 1951) is an American television host, best known as the longtime co-host of It's Showtime at the Apollo. She is a native of Tyler, Texas. Shepard has also worked as an actress and voice actor.

Pop culture
Kiki was referenced in the song "So Fresh, So Clean" by the hip hop group Outkast (released in 2001), "No Church in the Wild" on the duet album Watch the Throne by Jay Z and Kanye West (August 2011), and in "Keep My Coo" from the compilation album Everybody's Everything by Lil Peep (November 2019).

References

 

1951 births
Living people
African-American actresses
Actresses from Texas
American television actresses
People from Tyler, Texas
21st-century African-American people
21st-century African-American women
20th-century African-American people
20th-century African-American women